Homeobox protein Hox-C4 is a protein that in humans is encoded by the HOXC4 gene.

Function 

This gene belongs to the homeobox family of genes. The homeobox genes encode a highly conserved family of transcription factors that play an important role in morphogenesis in all multicellular organisms. Mammals possess four similar homeobox gene clusters, HOXA, HOXB, HOXC and HOXD, which are located on different chromosomes and consist of 9 to 11 genes arranged in tandem. This gene, HOXC4, is one of several homeobox HOXC genes located in a cluster on chromosome 12. Three genes, HOXC5, HOXC4 and HOXC6, share a 5' non-coding exon. Transcripts may include the shared exon spliced to the gene-specific exons, or they may include only the gene-specific exons. Two alternatively spliced variants that encode the same protein have been described for HOXC4. Transcript variant one includes the shared exon, and transcript variant two includes only gene-specific exons.

See also 
 Homeobox

Interactions 

HOXC4 has been shown to interact with Ku70.

References

Further reading

External links 
 

Transcription factors